Memari Assembly constituency is an assembly constituency in Purba Bardhaman district in the Indian state of West Bengal.

Overview
As per orders of the Delimitation Commission, No. 265 Memari  assembly constituency covers Memari municipality, Memari I community development block, and Kuchut, Satgachhia II gram panchayats of Memari II community development block.

Memari  assembly segment was earlier part of Burdwan (Lok Sabha constituency). As per orders of Delimitation Commission it is part of No. 38 Bardhaman Purba (Lok Sabha constituency).

Members of Legislative Assembly

Election results

2021

2016

2011

 

.# Swing calculated on Congress+Trinamool Congress vote percentages taken together in 2006.

1977-2006
Sandhya Bhattacharya of CPI(M) won the Memari assembly seat defeating her nearest rival Sk. Mohammad Ismile of Trinamool Congress in the 2006 assembly elections. Contests in most years were multi cornered but only winners and runners are being mentioned. In 2001 and 1996, Tapas Chattopadhyay of CPI(M) defeated Syed Mustaq Murshed of Trinamool Congress and Naba Kumar Chatterjee of Congress in the respective years. In 1991, 1987 and 1982, Maharani Konar of CPI(M) defeated Abdul Ohidmolla, Naba Kumar Chatterjee and Sabyasachi Samanta, all of Congress, in the respective years. In 1977, Benoy Konar of CPI(M) defeated Surya Narayan Pal of Janata Party.

1962-1972
Naba Kumar Chatterjee of Congress won in 1972. Benoy Krishna Konar of CPI(M) won in 1971 and 1969. P.Bishayee won in 1967. In 1962, Suchand Soren of CPI won the Memari seat reserved for scheduled tribes. Prior to that the seat did not exist.

References

Politics of Paschim Bardhaman district
Assembly constituencies of West Bengal
Politics of Purba Bardhaman district